The 2021 Monterrey Open (also known as the Abierto GNP Seguros for sponsorship reasons) was a women's tennis tournament played on outdoor hard courts. It was the 13th edition of the Monterrey Open and a WTA 250 tournament on the 2021 WTA Tour. It took place at the Club Sonoma in Monterrey, Mexico, from 15 to 21 March 2021.

Champions

Singles 

  Leylah Annie Fernandez def.  Viktorija Golubic, 6–1, 6–4.

This was Fernandez's first WTA tour title.

Doubles 

  Caroline Dolehide /  Asia Muhammad def.  Heather Watson /  Saisai Zheng 6–2, 6–3.

Points and prize money

Point distribution

Prize money 

*per team

Singles main draw entrants

Seeds 

1 Rankings as of 8 March 2021.

Other entrants 
The following players received wildcards into the main draw: 
  Caroline Dolehide
  CoCo Vandeweghe
  Renata Zarazúa

The following player received entry into the singles main draw using a protected ranking:
  Katie Boulter
  Anna Karolína Schmiedlová

The following player received entry as a special exempt:
  Eugenie Bouchard

The following players received entry from the qualifying draw:
  Viktorija Golubic
  Kaja Juvan
  Anna Kalinskaya
  María Camila Osorio Serrano
  Mayar Sherif
  Lesia Tsurenko

The following players received entry as lucky losers: 
  Harriet Dart
  Kristína Kučová

Withdrawals 
Before the tournament
  Victoria Azarenka → replaced by  Jasmine Paolini
  Marie Bouzková → replaced by  Kristína Kučová
  Coco Gauff → replaced by  Varvara Gracheva
  Polona Hercog → replaced by  Nina Stojanović
  Ons Jabeur → replaced by  Anna Karolína Schmiedlová
  Johanna Konta → replaced by  Tamara Zidanšek
  Danka Kovinić → replaced by  Harriet Dart
  Magda Linette → replaced by  Martina Trevisan
  Ajla Tomljanović → replaced by  Zhu Lin

During the tournament
  Kaja Juvan (Covid-19 illness)

Doubles main draw entrants

Seeds 

 Rankings as of March 8, 2021.

Other entrants 
The following pairs received wildcards into the doubles main draw:
  Fernanda Contreras /  Marcela Zacarías  
  María Camila Osorio Serrano /  Renata Zarazúa

Withdrawals 
Before the tournament
  Marie Bouzková /  Sara Sorribes Tormo → replaced by  Paula Kania-Choduń /  Katarzyna Piter
  Anna Kalinskaya /  Viktória Kužmová → replaced by  Greet Minnen /  Ingrid Neel
During the tournament
  Anna Blinkova /  Nadia Podoroska (right hip injury)

Retirements 
  Greet Minnen /  Ingrid Neel (gastrointestinal illness)

References

External links 
 Official website

2021 WTA Tour
2021
2021 in Mexican tennis
March 2021 sports events in Mexico